Johns Hopkins Glacier is a  long glacier located in Glacier Bay National Park and Preserve in the U.S. state of Alaska. It was named after Johns Hopkins University in Baltimore, Maryland in 1893 by Harry Fielding Reid. It is one of the few advancing tidewater glaciers of the Fairweather Range. Access to the face of the glacier is limited to the Johns Hopkins Inlet.

See also
 List of glaciers

References

Glaciers of Glacier Bay National Park and Preserve
Glaciers of Hoonah–Angoon Census Area, Alaska
Johns Hopkins University
Glaciers of Unorganized Borough, Alaska